The A8 is a national road in Latvia connecting Riga to Lithuanian border (Meitene), through Jelgava, also known as Jelgava highway in Latvia. The road is part of European route E77 and Latvian TEN-T road network. After the border, the road turns into Lithuanian A12.  The length of A8 in Latvian territory is 76 kilometers. Currently A8 has 2x2 lanes until Jelgava bypass, other parts have 1x1 or 2x1 lanes. The current speed limit is 100 km/h. Plans to reconstruct A8 in to a motorway have been many. First, in 2004, then in 2010, but they never started due to financial reasons. In the recent years A8 has been reconstructed in many stretches.  The average AADT on A8 in 2015 was 13,711 cars per day.

A08